The following is the list of squads that took place in the women's field hockey tournament at the 1984 Summer Olympics.

Australia
The following players represented Australia:

 Kym Ireland
 Liane Tooth
 Pamela Glossop
 Susan Watkins
 Lorraine Hillas
 Robyn Leggatt
 Sandra Pisani
 Penny Gray
 Robyn Holmes
 Sharon Buchanan
 Marian Aylmore
 Colleen Pearce
 Loretta Dorman
 Julene Sunderland
 Trisha Heberle
 Evelyn Botfield

Canada
The following players represented Canada:

 Laurie Lambert
 Sharon Creelman
 Jean Major
 Laura Branchaud
 Lynne Beecroft
 Shelley Andrews
 Darlene Stoyka
 Phyllis Ellis
 Karen Hewlett
 Diane Virjee
 Terry Wheatley
 Lisa Bauer
 Sheila Forshaw
 Sharon Bayes
 Zoe MacKinnon
 Nancy Charlton

Netherlands
The following players represented the Netherlands:

 Det de Beus
 Alette Pos
 Margriet Zegers
 Laurien Willemse
 Marjolein Eijsvogel
 Fieke Boekhorst
 Carina Benninga
 Sandra Le Poole
 Elsemieke Hillen
 Marieke van Doorn
 Sophie von Weiler
 Aletta van Manen
 Irene Hendriks
 Lisette Sevens
 Martine Ohr
 Anneloes Nieuwenhuizen

New Zealand
The following players represented New Zealand:

 Lesley Murdoch
 Barbara Tilden
 Mary Clinton
 Sue McLeish
 Isobel Thomson
 Sandra Mackie
 Jillian Smith
 Jane Goulding
 Robyn Blackman
 Jan Martin
 Harina Kohere
 Jennifer McDonald
 Shirley Haig
 Cathy Thompson
Lesley Elliott
 Christine Arthur

United States
The following players represented the United States:

 Gwen Cheeseman
 Beth Anders
 Kathleen McGahey
 Anita Miller
 Regina Buggy
 Christine Larson-Mason
 Beth Beglin
 Marcella Place
 Julie Staver
 Diane Moyer
 Sheryl Johnson
 Charlene Morett
 Karen Shelton
 Brenda Stauffer
 Leslie Milne
 Judy Strong

West Germany
The following players represented West Germany:

 Ursula Thielemann
 Elke Drüll
 Beate Deininger
 Christina Moser
 Hella Roth
 Dagmar Bremer
 Birgit Hagen
 Birgit Hahn
 Gaby Appel
 Andrea Weiermann-Lietz
 Corinna Lingnau
 Martina Hallmen
 Gabriela Schöwe
 Patricia Ott
 Susanne Schmid
 Sigrid Landgraf

References

1984